Shaban Shefket is a former Bulgarian footballer of Bulgarian-Turkish descent. He played for PFC Shumen 2010 in the 1990s when the club achieved promotion to the A PFG. He has also represented amateur side "Трите мечки" ("The three bears") that won the 2007 edition of the Kamenitsa Fan Cup and unusually for a footballer has supplemented his income by working as a fortune-teller.

References

Bulgarian footballers
Bulgarian people of Turkish descent
Living people
First Professional Football League (Bulgaria) players
Association footballers not categorized by position
Year of birth missing (living people)